Unfold may refer to:

Science
 Unfoldable cardinal, in mathematics
 Unfold (higher-order function), in computer science a family of anamorphism functions
 Unfoldment (disambiguation), in spirituality and physics
 Unfolded protein response, in biochemistry
 Equilibrium unfolding, in biochemistry
 Unfolded state (denatured protein), in biochemistry
 Maximum variance unfolding (semidefinite embedding), in computer science

Music
 Unfold (Marié Digby album), 2008
 Unfold (John O'Callaghan album), 2011
 Unfold (The Necks album), 2017
 "Unfold" (Porter Robinson song), 2021
 "Unfold", a song by De La Soul from the 2016 album And the Anonymous Nobody...

See also
 Fold (disambiguation)